Brunn is a German surname. Notable people with the surname include:

Christian Valentin Brunn (born 1994), German DJ
Francis Brunn (1922–2004), German juggler
George Le Brunn (1863–1905), British songwriter
Gustav Brunn, German immigrant to the United States, developer of the Old Bay Seasoning blend
Heinrich Brunn (1822–1894), German archaeologist
Hermann Brunn (1862–1939), German mathematician 
James von Brunn (1920–2010), American murderer

See also
Brunn (disambiguation)
Bruun

German-language surnames